Sprockets is a Canadian short film television series which aired on CBC Television from 1975 to 1976.

Premise
This series featured short films by independent Canadian filmmakers, including animated and experimental works. Hosts for each episode were selected from Michael Hirsh, Frederick Manter, Whitney Smith, Mark Stone and Jana Veverka.

Scheduling
In its debut season, this half-hour series was broadcast Thursdays at 10:00 p.m. (Eastern) from 16 January to 13 March 1975. It moved to Fridays at 10:30 p.m. from 18 April to 27 June 1975. For the second season, it was broadcast Thursdays at 10:30 p.m. from 11 March to 1 April 1976, then another run on Tuesdays at 10:30 p.m. from 22 June to 29 June 1976.

Episodes
Films included:

At 99: A Portrait Of Louise Tandy Murch (Deepa Saltzman)
The Brotherhood (Al Sens), animation from Vancouver
Dull Day Demolition (Insight Productions)
The Journals Of Susanna Moodie (Marie Waisberg)
O Canada (Henning Jacobsen)

References

External links

CBC Television original programming
1975 Canadian television series debuts
1976 Canadian television series endings